La Crosse is a rural small town in Whitman County, Washington, United States. The population was 313 at the 2010 census.

History
With the completion in 1888 of the Oregon Railroad and Navigation Company (O.R. & N) railroad line between Riparia and La Crosse, George Dawson and his wife built a shack constructed from railroad ties. By 1889, La Crosse had a population of 12. The first real store was constructed in 1899 by Tom Shobe.

La Crosse was incorporated on February 19, 1917. As of the 2000 census, there were 380 people, which had decreased to 313 people at the 2010 census.

Geography
La Crosse is located at  (46.814289, -117.880097).

Climate
According to the Köppen Climate Classification system, La Crosse has a warm-summer Mediterranean climate, abbreviated "Csb" on climate maps.

Demographics

2010 census
As of the census of 2010, there were 313 people, 153 households, and 96 families residing in the town. The racial makeup of the town was 95.8% White, 0.3% African American, 0.6% Native American, 0.3% Asian, 0.3% from other races, and 2.6% from two or more races. Hispanic or Latino of any race were 0.3% of the population.

There were 153 households, of which 19.6% had children under the age of 18 living with them, 52.9% were married couples living together, 5.2% had a female householder with no husband present, 4.6% had a male householder with no wife present, and 37.3% were non-families. 33.3% of all households were made up of individuals, and 22.9% had someone living alone who was 65 years of age or older. The average household size was 2.05 and the average family size was 2.53.

The median age in the town was 51.8 years. 15.7% of residents were under the age of 18; 5.4% were between the ages of 18 and 24; 14.8% were from 25 to 44; 34.2% were from 45 to 64; and 30% were 65 years of age or older. The gender makeup of the town was 50.2% male and 49.8% female.

2000 census
As of the census of 2000, there were 380 people, 164 households, and 105 families residing in the town. The population density was 1,101.6 people per square mile (431.5/km2). There were 187 housing units at an average density of 542.1 per square mile (212.4/km2). The racial makeup of the town was 93.42% White, 3.16% Native American, 0.26% Asian, 0.53% from other races, and 2.63% from two or more races. Hispanic or Latino of any race were 0.53% of the population.

There were 164 households, out of which 31.1% had children under the age of 18 living with them, 54.3% were married couples living together, 9.1% had a female householder with no husband present, and 35.4% were non-families. 32.9% of all households were made up of individuals, and 19.5% had someone living alone who was 65 years of age or older. The average household size was 2.32 and the average family size was 2.90.

In the town, the age distribution of the population shows 28.2% under the age of 18, 1.6% from 18 to 24, 26.6% from 25 to 44, 21.1% from 45 to 64, and 22.6% who were 65 years of age or older. The median age was 42 years. For every 100 females, there were 99.0 males. For every 100 females age 18 and over, there were 88.3 males.

The median income for a household in the town was $30,893, and the median income for a family was $40,833. Males had a median income of $30,972 versus $20,313 for females. The per capita income for the town was $16,656. About 2.1% of families and 5.9% of the population were below the poverty line, including 4.5% of those under age 18 and 6.0% of those age 65 or over.

Notable groups and events
The La Crosse Arts and Beautification Council was created in 2005 with aspirations of renovating downtown La Crosse while promoting the arts, local culture, and history of La Crosse and the Palouse. Events have included the Valentine Fine Arts Night and the Spring Faire.

The Council was disbanded in 2008 after sexual assault allegations against head chairman Barbara DeSmall.

The La Crosse Gun Club holds an annual "Bacon & Crab Shooting" event at the end of January.

The La Crosse Farmers Festival, held in mid-June, is celebrated with a parade and live entertainment. This has not been held for several years, and it is not known why.

References

External links
 Town of LaCrosse
 LaCrosse Arts & Beautification Council

Towns in Washington (state)
Towns in Whitman County, Washington
1917 establishments in Washington (state)